Powers High School is a public high school in Powers, Oregon, United States.

Academics
In 2008, 80% of the school's seniors received their high school diploma. Of 10 students, 8 graduated, 1 dropped out, and 1 received a modified diploma.

References

High schools in Coos County, Oregon
Public high schools in Oregon
Public middle schools in Oregon